The white feather is a widely recognised propaganda symbol. It has, among other things, represented cowardice or conscientious pacifism; as in A. E. W. Mason's 1902 book, The Four Feathers. In Britain during the First World War it was often given to males out of uniform by women to shame them publicly into signing up.  In the United States armed forces, however, it is used to signify extraordinary bravery and excellence in combat marksmanship.

As a symbol of cowardice
The use of the phrase "white feather" to symbolise cowardice is attested from the late 18th century, according to the Oxford English Dictionary. The OED cites A Classical Dictionary of the Vulgar Tongue (1785), in which lexicographer Francis Grose wrote "White feather, he has a white feather, he is a coward, an allusion to a game cock, where having a white feather, is a proof he is not of the true game breed". This was in the context of cockfighting, a common entertainment in Georgian England.

The Crusades 
Shame was exerted upon men in England and France who had not taken the cross at the time of the Third Crusade. "A great many men sent each other wool and distaff, hinting that if anyone failed to join this military undertaking they were only fit for women's work". Wool played an important role in the medieval economy, and a distaff is a tool for spinning the raw material into yarn; the activities of textile production were so firmly associated with girls and women that "distaff" became a metonym for women's work.

World War I
At the start of World War I, Admiral Charles Fitzgerald, who was a strong advocate of conscription, wanted to increase the number of those enlisting in the armed forces. Therefore he organized on 30 August 1914 a group of thirty women in his home town of Folkestone to hand out white feathers to any men that were not in uniform. Fitzgerald believed using women to shame the men into enlisting would be the most effective method of encouraging enlistment. The group that he founded (with prominent members being Emma Orczy and the prominent author Mary Augusta Ward) was known as the White Feather Brigade or the Order of the White Feather. 

Although the draft would conscript both sexes, only males would be on the front lines.
While the true effectiveness of the campaign is impossible to judge, it spread throughout several other nations in the empire. In Britain, it started to cause problems for the government when public servants and men in essential occupations came under pressure to enlist. That prompted Home Secretary Reginald McKenna to issue employees in state industries with lapel badges reading "King and Country" to indicate that they were serving the war effort. Likewise, the Silver War Badge, which was given to service personnel who had been honourably discharged by wounds or sickness, was first issued in September 1916 to prevent veterans from being challenged for not wearing uniform. Anecdotes from the time indicate that the campaign was unpopular among soldiers, not least because soldiers who were home on leave could find themselves presented with feathers.

One example was Private Ernest Atkins, who was on leave from the Western Front. He was riding a tram when he was presented with a white feather by a girl sitting behind him. He smacked her across the face with his pay book and said, "Certainly I'll take your feather back to the boys at Passchendaele. I'm in civvies because people think my uniform might be lousy, but if I had it on I wouldn't be half as lousy as you".

Private Norman Demuth, who had been discharged from the British Army after he had been wounded in 1916, received numerous white feathers after he returned from the Western Front. In Forgotten Voices of the Great War, Demuth is quoted as saying:
"Almost the last feather I received was on a bus. I was sitting near the door when I became aware of two women on the other side talking at me, and I thought to myself, 'Oh Lord, here we go again'. One lent forward and produced a feather and said, 'Here's a gift for a brave soldier. I took it and said,'Thank you very much- I wanted one of those.' Then I took my pipe out of my pocket and put this feather down the stem and worked it in a way I've never worked a pipe cleaner before. When it was filthy I pulled it out and said, 'You know, we didn't get these in the trenches', and handed it back to her. She instinctively put out her hand and took it, so there she was sitting with this filthy pipe cleaner in her hand and all the other people on the bus began to get indignant. Then she dropped it and got up to get out, but we were nowhere near a stopping place and the bus went on quite a long way while she got well and truly barracked by the rest of the people on the bus. I sat back and laughed like mad."
Supporters of the campaign were not easily put off. A woman who confronted a young man in a London park demanded to know why he was not in the army. "Because I am a German", he replied. He received a white feather anyway.

Occasionally injured veterans were mistakenly targeted, such as Reuben W. Farrow who after being aggressively asked by a woman on a tram why he would not do his duty, turned around and showed his missing hand causing her to apologize.

Perhaps the most misplaced use of a white feather was when one was presented to Seaman George Samson, who was on his way in civilian clothes to a public reception being held in his honour for having been awarded the Victoria Cross for gallantry in the Gallipoli campaign.

Roland Gwynne, later the mayor of Eastbourne (1929–1931), received a feather from a relative. That prompted him to enlist, and he would receive the Distinguished Service Order for bravery.

The writer Compton Mackenzie, then a serving soldier, complained about the activities of the Order of the White Feather. He argued that "idiotic young women were using white feathers to get rid of boyfriends of whom they were tired". The pacifist Fenner Brockway said he received so many white feathers that he had enough to make a fan.

World War II
The white feather campaign was renewed during World War II.

As a symbol of pacifism and peace
In contrast, the white feather has been used by some pacifist organizations as an icon of abstinence from violence.

In the 1870s, the Māori prophet of passive resistance Te Whiti o Rongomai promoted the wearing of white feathers by his followers at Parihaka. They are still worn by the iwi associated with that area, and by Te Ati Awa in Wellington. They are known as te raukura, which literally means the red feather, but metaphorically, the chiefly feather. They are usually three in number, interpreted as standing for "glory to God, peace on earth, goodwill toward people" (Luke 2:14). Albatross feathers are preferred but any white feathers will do. They are usually worn in the hair or on the lapel (but not from the ear).

Some time after the war, pacifists found an alternative interpretation of the white feather as a symbol of peace. The apocryphal story goes that in 1775, Quakers in a Friends meeting house in Easton, New York were faced by a tribe of Indians on the war path. Rather than flee, the Quakers fell silent and waited. The Indian chief came into the meeting house and finding no weapons he declared the Quakers as friends. On leaving he took a white feather from his quiver and attached it to the door as a sign to leave the building unharmed.

In 1937 the Peace Pledge Union sold 500 white feather badges as symbols of peace.

Other meanings
In the United States, the white feather has also become a symbol of courage, persistence, and superior combat marksmanship. Its most notable wearer was US Marine Corps Gunnery Sergeant Carlos Hathcock, who was awarded the Silver Star medal for bravery during the Vietnam War. Hathcock picked up a white feather on a mission and wore it in his hat to taunt the enemy. He was so feared by enemy troops that they put a price on his head. Its wear on combat headgear flaunts an insultingly-easy target for enemy snipers.

Portrayals in popular culture

Literature
The Four Feathers (1902), an adventure novel, by A. E. W. Mason, tells of Harry Feversham, an officer in the British Army, who decides to resign his commission the day before his regiment is dispatched to fight in Sudan (the 1882 First War of Sudan, leading to the fall of Khartoum). Harry's three fellow officers and his fiancée conclude that he is resigning to avoid fighting in the conflict, and each send him a white feather.  Stung by the criticism, Harry sails to Sudan, disguises himself as an Arab, and looks for the opportunity to redeem his honour. He manages this by fighting a covert war on behalf of the British, saving the life of one of his colleagues in the process. On returning to England he asks each of his accusers to take back one of the feathers.

The 1907 P. G. Wodehouse novel The White Feather is a school story about cowardice and the efforts a boy goes to redeem himself by learning the sport of boxing.

Rilla of Ingleside (1921) by Lucy Maud Montgomery, the penultimate book in her Anne of Green Gables series, sees Anne Shirley's son, Walter Blythe, enlist in the First World War after receiving a white feather in the mail; he subsequently dies in battle.

The Man Who Stayed at Home, a 1914 play by J. E. Harold Terry and Lechmere Worrall, was renamed The White Feather when staged in North America. The title character is a British secret agent who is falsely perceived to be a coward for his refusal to enlist as a soldier.

In The Camels are Coming (1932), the first collection of Biggles stories, Biggles is handed a white feather by a young woman while on leave in civilian clothes, who is later taken aback to find that he is one of the Royal Flying Corps' leading pilots.

In Pat Barker's 1991 novel Regeneration, the character Burns is given two white feathers during his home leave from Craiglockhart War Hospital.

In the 1997 book Jingo (novel), citizens of Ankh-Morpork are handed white feathers for not enlisting to fight in the impending war against Klatch.

In the children's novel Birds of a Feather (2004) by Jacqueline Winspear, four young girls take it upon themselves to hand out feathers to young men not in uniform in an effort to shame them into enlisting on Britain's side in The Great War.

In the 2015 graphic novel Suffrajitsu: Mrs. Pankhurst's Amazons, Christabel Pankhurst is depicted encouraging women to hand white feathers to every young man they see out of uniform.  Persephone Wright, the protagonist of the story and heretofore a staunch supporter of Pankhurst's Votes for Women campaigns, rejects the idea on ethical grounds, saying "a man who's been shamed into service isn't a volunteer at all".

Music
The Order of the White Feather was the inspiration for the Weddings Parties Anything song "Scorn of the Women", which concerns a man who is deemed medically unfit for service when he attempts to enlist, and is unjustly accused of cowardice.

In 1983, new wave band Kajagoogoo released their debut album called White Feathers, whose opener was the title track, a light-hearted allegory for weak people, whereas the final track, Frayo, had a political flavour, referencing cowardice as the cause for an unchanging war-torn world.

In 1985, progressive rock band Marillion released an anti-war song called "White Feather" as the ending track to their album Misplaced Childhood.

In 2009, "White Feather" was released as the third single from the Wolfmother album entitled Cosmic Egg.

Film and television
The novel The Four Feathers has been the basis of at least seven feature films, the most recent being The Four Feathers (2002), starring Heath Ledger.  It was also parodied in the Dad's Army episode "The Two and a Half Feathers".

In the 1980 BBC TV series To Serve Them All My Days, David Powlett-Jones, a shell-shocked Tommy, takes a position in a boys' school.  Suspecting that fellow teacher Carter may be avoiding war duty, he muses, "I'd give a good deal to know whether he's really got a gammy knee", to which an acerbic colleague responds, "I suppose we couldn't get some chubby cherub to give him the white feather" as a means of accusing the suspected malingerer.

The 2000 Canadian miniseries, Anne of Green Gables: The Continuing Story, includes a scene in which Anne Shirley's fiancé, Gilbert Blythe, receives a white feather from a young woman, despite the fact he is a medical doctor and therefore one who provides an essential service at home. He eventually does enlist, and much of the plot deals with Anne searching for him when he's declared missing in action. As noted above, in the original novels, it is Anne and Gilbert's son, Walter, who enlists after receiving a feather.

In the short-lived 2007 British period drama Lilies, the brother of the protagonists is discharged from the military during World War I after his boat sinks and he is one of a handful of shell-shocked survivors. Billy gets sent and given numerous white feathers for his perceived cowardice, and begins to hallucinate them choking him. This is a recurring theme throughout the series.

In the 2010 Australian film Beneath Hill 60 about real-life soldier Oliver Woodward, Woodward, before enlisting, receives several feathers to which he jokingly states, "Just a few more feathers, and I'll have a whole chicken."

In the first episode of the second season of Downton Abbey, a pair of young women interrupt a benefit concert to hand out white feathers to the men who have not enlisted, before being ordered out by an angry Earl of Grantham.

In the 2021 film The King's Man, Conrad is given a white feather to shame him into enlisting in the British Army.

Comics
DC Comics' spoof superhero team the Inferior Five includes a cowardly archer named White Feather. He was intended as a reference to DC Comics' more heroic character Green Arrow and similar "super archer" characters.

Notes

External links
Order of the White Feather
Peace Pledge Union
The Order of the White Feather.

Symbols
Feather, white
Men in history
Propaganda